in Japan are roads usually planned, numbered and maintained by the government of the respective prefecture (-to, -dō, -fu or -ken), independent of other prefectures – as opposed to national roads (kokudō), which in legal terms include national expressways (kōsoku jidōsha kokudō), and municipal roads ([ku]shichōsondō). Where a national or prefectural road runs through the territory of a designated major city, the city government assumes part of the responsibility for these roads. By length, 10.7 % of public roads in Japan were prefectural roads as of 2011; by usage, they carried more than 30% of all traffic volume on public roads as of 2007.

Prefectural roads are marked with a blue hexagon, with the number centered.  Most usually end at another prefectural road, or national route, or occasionally at or very close to a Japan Railway station.

If a prefectural road does cross into another prefecture, even if for a few hundred feet, its number is not reused by the prefecture it crosses into.  Numbers are used only once in each prefecture, regardless of where the road begins or ends. However, there are some major roads running through several prefectures which have the same number in all prefectures involved. For example, the "Sano-Koga line" (Sano-Koga-sen, 佐野古河線) that connects Sano city in Tochigi prefecture and Koga city in Ibaraki prefecture is continually designated as prefectural road 9 in all four prefectures it runs through, namely Tochigi, Gunma, Saitama and Ibaraki.

Some prefectural roads will also at times run for a short distance concurrent with a national route, but it is more common to see this with other prefectural roads.

Numbers used for national routes that run through a prefecture are often duplicated by prefectural routes but a national route and a prefectural route bearing the same number rarely if ever meet or cross each other.

See also 
 National highways of Japan
 Expressways of Japan

References

External links 

 MLIT: dōro-kyoku ("Road Bureau") , parts in English

 
Road